Bosio is a surname of Italian origin. Variations stemming from this surname include Bocio, Boccio, Bossi and Boselli, the latter being a common variation of Italian names. Also, Bossy and Bossie are two etymologically related forms found in French-speaking regions as well as in the United States.

The surname can refer to the following people:
 A.J. Bosio – (born 1967), Contemporary American Industrial Designer, sculptor and artist
 Angiolina Bosio – (1830–1859), Italian operatic soprano
 Antonio Bosio – (circa 1575–1629), Italian scholar and explorer
 Antonio Bosio – (16th century), Italian philosopher
 Catharine Mans Bosio – American biologist
 Chris Bosio – (born 1963), former Major League Baseball pitcher
 Edoardo Bosio – (1864 – 1927), Italian-Swiss footballing innovator
 François Joseph Bosio – (1769–1845), French sculptor
 Giacomo Bosio – (16th century) Knight of Chivasso
 Harald Bosio – (20th century), Austrian Nordic combined skier
 Iacopo Bosio – (15th century), Canavese author and poet
 Jamie Bosio – (born 1991), Gibraltarian footballer
 Jay Bosio – (born 1991), Gibraltarian footballer
 Pietro Bosio – (18th century), Architect and sculptor in Cremona
 Tomaso Bosio – (15th century), Knight of Asti
 Tommaso Bosio – (16th century), Bishop of Modena
 Victoria Bosio – (born 1994), Argentine tennis player
 Zeta Bosio – (born 1959), rock bassist and producer

See also 

 Bossio

Surnames
Surnames of Italian origin
Italian-language surnames